The Barbaira is a  stream of Liguria (Italy); it is the main tributary of the Nervia.

Geography 
The stream rises between punta dell'Arpetta and monte Simonasso, in the Ligurian Alps, and flows through a woody valley mainly heading south-east. When it reaches the centre of the comune of Rocchetta Nervina it gets from left side the waters of its main tributary, rio Oggia. It enters the Nervia at ponte Barbaira (71 m).

Main tributaries 

 Left hand:
 Rio d'Oggia: is the main tributary of the Barbaira and joins it in Rocchetta Nervina,
 Rio Pau.
 Right hand:
 Rio Massula: its source is located near Monte Abellio and reaches the Barbaira around one km south of Rocchetta Nervina.
 Rio Roglio,
 Rio Ubaghi di Sartu.

Sport 

The Barbaira is a well known site for practicing canyoning.

See also 

 List of rivers of Italy
 Parco naturale regionale delle Alpi Liguri

References

External links 

  Canyoning Barbaira: canyoning along the stream on www.ufficioguidefinale.it
  Rio Barbaira Rochetta Nervina (Imperia), French page on www.descente-canyon.com

Rivers of Italy
Rivers of Liguria
Rivers of the Province of Imperia
Tributaries of the Nervia
Rivers of the Alps